{{Speciesbox
| name = Mono Lake brine shrimp
| image = Artemia monica.jpg
| image_caption = Artemia monica (male)| status = LR/cd
| status_system = IUCN2.3
| status_ref =
| genus = Artemia
| species = monica
| authority = Verrill, 1869
}}Artemia monica, the Mono Lake brine shrimp, is a species of brine shrimp, endemic to Mono Lake in California, United States.

It is a sibling species of A. franciscana'', which is widespread in the Americas and also has been introduced elsewhere. The two are closely related, but completely prevented from interbreeding as they have different water requirements.

References

Anostraca